Dryobalanops oblongifolia is a species of plant in the family Dipterocarpaceae, native to regions of Southeast Asia and Maritime Southeast Asia.

The species name is derived from Latin ( = rather long and leaf ( = leaf); and refers to the shape of the leaf.

Description
Both produce heavy hardwood timber, which is sold under the trade name of Kapur.

Subspecies
There are two subspecies:
 Dryobalanops oblongifolia  subsp. oblongifolia  (synonym = Baillonodendron malayanum F.Heim)  — it is endemic to the island of Borneo.

It is found in at least one protected area (Kubah National Park), but is threatened elsewhere due to habitat loss. It is an emergent tree, up to 60 m tall, found in mixed dipterocarp forest on sandy clay soils.

Dryobalanops oblongifolia subsp. occidentalis  <small>P.S.Ashton (synonyms = Dryobalanops beccariana Ridl. & Dryobalanops ovalifolia Burkill)) — found in Sumatra and Peninsular Malaysia.

References

oblongifolia
Trees of Borneo
Trees of Sumatra
Trees of Peninsular Malaysia
Vulnerable flora of Asia
Plants described in 1874